The Dr. Knisley Covered Bridge is a historic wooden covered bridge located at West St. Clair Township in Bedford County, Pennsylvania, USA. It crosses Dunning Creek. It is one of 15 historic covered bridges in Bedford County.

It was listed on the National Register of Historic Places in 1980.

References 

Covered bridges on the National Register of Historic Places in Pennsylvania
Covered bridges in Bedford County, Pennsylvania
Wooden bridges in Pennsylvania
Bridges in Bedford County, Pennsylvania
National Register of Historic Places in Bedford County, Pennsylvania
Road bridges on the National Register of Historic Places in Pennsylvania
Burr Truss bridges in the United States